Bob Mahoney  is an English film director and producer.

Filmography

As director

References

External links 
 
 
 

Film directors from London
Film producers from London
Living people
Year of birth missing (living people)
Place of birth missing (living people)